Kyriakos Aslanidis (born 11 March 2002) is a Greek professional footballer who plays as a centre-back for Super League club Volos.

References

2002 births
Living people
Greek footballers
Greece youth international footballers
Super League Greece players
Super League Greece 2 players
Aris Thessaloniki F.C. players
Olympiacos Volos F.C. players
Volos N.F.C. players
Association football defenders
Footballers from Serres